Jean-Xavier de Lestrade (born 1 July 1963) is a French writer, director and producer of films and television series.

Early life and education
Lestrade was born in Mirande, Gers, in southwestern France. He studied law and journalism in Paris, and turned to making documentaries which scrutinize the mechanisms of society.

Career
Lestrade won an Oscar for Best Documentary for his ninth feature, Murder on a Sunday Morning, in 2001. He is also known for his film The Staircase, about the murder trial against author Michael Peterson, who was accused of killing his wife. He is an executive producer for the TV series Sin City Law (2007), which has been shown on the Sundance Channel in the US. His miniseries Laetitia, based on the tragic case of Laetitia Perrais, aired on HBO and HBO Max in late August 2021.

Filmography

References

External links 
 
 BBC interview, January 2005

People from Gers
1963 births
Living people
French film producers
Albert Londres Prize recipients
Directors of Best Documentary Feature Academy Award winners
French male non-fiction writers